Kathrin Krahfuss is a beauty queen who represented Austria in Miss World 2008 in South Africa.  She is a freelance artist. She spent four years with the Golden Circus and two with the Circus Picard.

External links
 Miss Austria 2008

1985 births
Living people
Miss World 2008 delegates
Austrian beauty pageant winners
People from Graz